Rhymes for the Nursery is a collection of English poems by sisters Jane and Ann Taylor, published in London in 1806. Probably the best-known poem in it is The Star ("Twinkle, Twinkle, Little Star").

References

External links
 Rhymes for the Nursery at Internet Archive
 

1806 poetry books
British children's books
Collections of nursery rhymes
English poetry collections
English-language books
Fictional ants
Fictional bees
Books about birds
Books about cats
Cattle in literature
Books about dogs
Fictional donkeys
Fictional Hymenoptera
Fictional sheep
1800s children's books